Jesús Valeriano Nchama Oyono (born 18 June 1995), known as Valeriano Nchama, is an Equatoguinean footballer who plays as a midfielder for Italian  club Arzignano and the Equatorial Guinea national team. He also holds Italian passport.

Early life
Valeriano was born in Malabo, Bioko Norte Province. When he was 2, his parents moved to Italy with him and his brother.

Club career
Valeriano joined Inter in 2012, after playing in the modest Aldini. In his first season, he was a member of the Allievi Nazionali team, the third largest of all Internazionale. Also that year, Valeriano has been a substitute in two Primavera League matches, but he was not used. He finally made his league debut with Inter second team in the following season, appearing in a 3–0 victory against Cittadella on 31 August 2013.

On 6 July 2021, he moved to Arzignano.

International career
Valeriano made his debut for the Equatoguinean senior team in a friendly against Libya on 4 September 2013. His international debut in an official match was three days later against Sierra Leone.

References

External links
 
 

1995 births
Living people
Sportspeople from Malabo
Equatoguinean emigrants to Italy
Naturalised citizens of Italy
Italian people of Equatoguinean descent
Equatoguinean footballers
Italian footballers
Association football midfielders
Equatorial Guinea international footballers
Serie D players
Calcio Montebelluna players
F.C. Arzignano Valchiampo players